Pseudoscilla verdensis is a species of sea snail, a marine gastropod mollusk in the family Pyramidellidae, the pyrams and their allies.

Description
The length of the shell varies between 1.3 mm and 2 mm.

Distribution
This species occurs in the following locations:
 Atlantic Europe
 Canary Islands
 Cape Verde
 Mediterranean Sea

References

External links
 To Biodiversity Heritage Library (1 publication)
 To Encyclopedia of Life
 To USNM Invertebrate Zoology Mollusca Collection
 

Pyramidellidae
Gastropods described in 1999
Molluscs of the Atlantic Ocean
Molluscs of the Mediterranean Sea
Molluscs of the Canary Islands
Gastropods of Cape Verde